Stefani Popova (born 12 February 1993) is a Bulgarian biathlete. She was born in Troyan. She has competed in the Biathlon World Cup, and represented Bulgaria at the Biathlon World Championships 2016.

References

1993 births
Living people
Bulgarian female biathletes
Biathletes at the 2018 Winter Olympics
Olympic biathletes of Bulgaria
21st-century Bulgarian women